St. Ignatius Roman Catholic Church is a historic Roman Catholic church located at St. Inigoes, St. Mary's County, Maryland. The church and its adjacent burial ground are situated on about two acres of land that are enclosed within a late 19th-century iron fence. The church was constructed between 1785 and 1787, with the sacristy added in 1817. The church walls are 21 inches thick, of brick laid in Flemish bond.  Atop the roof is a small wooden belfry that in 1933 replaced a larger one in this same location.

St. Ignatius Roman Catholic Church was listed on the National Register of Historic Places in 1975.

First Catholic Parish in English-speaking North America 

It is a direct descendant of Maryland's first Roman Catholic Chapel at St. Mary's City, whose communicants formed the first nucleus of American Catholicism. The Parish, then connected to the one in St. Mary's City Maryland also fell under the umbrella of the first establishment of religious freedom in America, by George Calvert and his sons who established the new colony as a refuge for persecuted Catholics.

Colonial Relics 

The church contains artifacts from the original "The Ark" and "The Dove" sailing ships, which bore the first settlers to the Maryland colony in 1633–34.

Stained glass depiction of local Indian chief in battle 

The church also has a very old stained glass depiction of the local paramount Indian Chief in battle with rival Indians. That Chief later converted to Christianity and was a member of the parish in the 1640s.

Gallery

References

External links
, including undated photo, at Maryland Historical Trust

St. Mary's County Historic Preservation Commission: St. Ignatius Roman Catholic Church entry
Visit St. Mary's City

Churches on the National Register of Historic Places in Maryland
Churches in St. Mary's County, Maryland
Roman Catholic churches in Maryland
Roman Catholic churches completed in 1787
Historic American Buildings Survey in Maryland
1787 establishments in Maryland
18th-century Roman Catholic church buildings in the United States
National Register of Historic Places in St. Mary's County, Maryland